Sergey Vladimirovich Potapenko (Belarusian: Сяргей Уладзіміравіч Патапенка, Siargiej Uladzimiravič Patapienka) is a Belarusian Military leader and the current Deputy Minister of Defense. He was born on 14 March 1961 in Rzhavka, a section of the Minsk region of the Byelorussian SSR, which is modern-day Belarus.

In 1982, he graduated from the Ulyanovsk Guards Higher Tank Command School. He served as a commander of a tank platoon.

He graduated from the Malinovsky Military Armoured Forces Academy in 1992. He worked for the 72nd Joint Training Centre on several staff positions and rose through the ranks from being a senior officer of the training division to the head of the training centre.

In 2008, Potapenko was appointed deputy commander of the North-Western Operational Command. He also commanded  the Western Operational Command from 2010 to 2015.

In June 2015, he served as the head of the Main Combat Training Directorate of the Belarusian Armed Forces. On 12 January 2016, Potapenko was appointed Deputy Minister of Defence by order of a presidential decree. It was in this position where he has commanded every Minsk Independence Day Parade since July 2016 on Victors Avenue. He was put under sanctions by Lithuania over his role in suppressing the 2020 Belarusian protests.

References

Living people
Belarusian military personnel
1961 births